African Americans have played an essential role in the history of Arkansas, but their role has often been marginalized as they confronted a society and polity controlled by white supremacists. During the slavery era to 1865, they were considered property and were subjected to the harsh conditions of forced labor. After the Civil War and the passage of the 13th, 14th, and 15th Reconstuction Amendments to the U.S. Constitution, African Americans gained their freedom and the right to vote. However, the rise of Jim Crow laws in the 1890s and early 1900s led to a period of segregation and discrimination that lasted into the 1960s. Most were farmers, working their own property or poor sharecroppers on white-owned land, or very poor day laborers. By World War I, there was steady emigration from farms to nearby cities such as Little Rock and Memphis, as well as to St. Louis and Chicago.

During the Civil Rights Movement of the 1950s and 1960s, the African Americans fought for an end to segregation and discrimination. The Little Rock Nine, a group of Black students who enrolled in the previously all-white Little Rock Central High School in 1957, became a national symbol of the struggle for civil rights.

In the decades since the Civil Rights Movement of the 1960s, progress has been made in the state, including the election of Black politicians to local and state offices, and the desegregation of schools and public spaces. However, disparities in areas such as education, healthcare, and economic opportunity still persist.

In the 20th and 21st centuries, Black women in Arkansas have  been continued to be active in the struggle for civil rights. Women such as Daisy Bates, who played a significant role in the integration of Little Rock Central High School, and Lottie Shackelford, the first Black woman elected to the Little Rock City Board of Directors, helped to bring about significant change in the state.  Today, Black women in Arkansas continue to face challenges related to systemic racism and discrimination. However, they continue to be leaders in their communities, working to effect change and improve the lives of those around them.

History

Slavery
Black people were brought to Arkansas as slaves as part of French colonization in the 1720s. At the time of the first US census of Arkansas in 1810, they numbered 188, comprising roughly 18% of the population. The African American population of Arkansas would grow in proportion, comprising 110,000 and 25% of the population in 1860 on the eve of the American Civil War. African Americans lived throughout the state, and were primarily made to work on cotton plantations; some were made to work skilled trades. Living conditions were barely adequate for survival, and African Americans had a mortality rate thirty percent higher than the white population (although the mortality rate in Arkansas was slightly better than the national average for African Americans). Slave escapes were common, despite the risk of physical punishment. Little is known about the culture of African Americans of this era,  but it is clear that the African American population of this time managed to build cultural institutions and practices despite the immense hardships faced.

Reconstruction
Reconstruction in Arkansas was the period 1865-1874 when the United States government, using the Army, worked to rebuild the South and tried to ensure that the newly freed slaves were granted equal rights and protections under the law. When the Union army occupied the state in 1864, the Blacks were granted legal freedom, and many began to work towards economic and social independence. They established their own schools, churches, and businesses, and after 1868 some were even elected to political office.  The Republican Party was dominant in Arkansas, and nearly all African Americans supported the party as it was seen as the party of abolition and emancipation. In 1868, the Arkansas State Constitution was rewritten to give Black people the right to vote and hold office, making Arkansas the first former Confederate state to do so. However, Reconstruction in Arkansas was not without challenges.  The Republican Party was deeply factionalized and spent much of its energy on internal battles.  White supremacist groups, such as the Ku Klux Klan, were active in the state and used violence and intimidation to try to suppress Black voting and political power.  In 1874, the Democrats regained control of the state government, and the era of Reconstruction came to an end. The Democrats worked to roll back many of the legal gains that Black people had made during Reconstruction, and Black political power in Arkansas was suppressed for nine decades to come. 
Despite these challenges, the Reconstruction era in Arkansas was a time of significant progress for African Americans. Many Black people gained education and skills, and some were able to establish successful farms,  businesses and careers. The era also laid the groundwork for future civil rights movements and political activism in the state.

Jim Crow Era, 1874-1964

Schools
After the conservative whites regained control of the state government in 1874 , additional state funding for black schools was minimal. In 1912 Julius Rosenwald, multi-millionaire head of Sears Roebuck, set up a program to fund black schools across the South. His Rosenwald Fund financed 389 public school buildings in forty-five counties in Arkansas.  They included classroom buildings, shops, and teachers’ homes.  It gave $300,000 in an age when few blacks earned more than $100 a year.   The famous black educator Booker T. Washington helped Rosenwald design a program that stimulated local support. The state or county government owned and maintained all of the schools, and the land was usually donated by a white landowner. The local community was required  to match the grant through cash, materials, or physical labor, so that the community would have a strong continuing commitment to the program. As a result building campaigns were initiated by local Black leaders. The new buildings were a measure of the Black community’s determination to provide a decent education for its youth.  

In addition to the Rosenwald supported public schools, a number of northern Protestant missionary societies provided funds for schools for Blacks, as well as supplying teachers. The American Missionary Association, a northern  Protestant charity set up numerous schools for freedmen all across the  South starting in the Civil War. They operated 53 schools in 1868 in Arkansas. Some closed and the rest merged by 1878.  Thus in Arkadelphia, Clark County, the Arkadelphia Baptist Academy was operated  by the American Baptist Home Mission Society.  The nearby Arkadelphia Presbyterian Academy was operated by the  Presbyterian Board of Missions for Freedmen after 1889.

Lynching
Lynching of African Americans became a major device used by white supremacist to suppress the African American community, under the pretense of law and order. Many killings went unreported, but there are detailed reports for 231 lynchings of Black men in the state from 1860 to 1930.

Elaine Massacre, 1919

The Elaine Massacre was a violent racial conflict in 1919 that took place in Elaine, a village in eastern Arkansas with a population of about 400. Trouble began on September 30, 1919, when African American sharecroppers in the area met at a church to discuss ways to demand better prices for their cotton crops. The meeting was held by a local chapter of the Progressive Farmers and Household Union of America, a new organization dedicated to improving the economic and social conditions of black farmers in the South. Word of the meeting spread, and local white planters became concerned that the sharecroppers were organizing to demand better wages and working conditions. A group of white men formed a posse and attacked the sharecroppers at the church. One white man was killed and several injured as the sharecroppers armed themselves and fought back.

The ensuing violence lasted for several days, as white vigilantes and federal troops were brought in to suppress the sharecroppers. Estimates vary, but it is believed that anywhere from 100 to 240 or even more African Americans were killed, while five white men were also killed. The aftermath saw hundreds of African Americans arrested. The twelve who were sentenced to death were eventually acquitted after the NAACP sent in a legal team.  The massacre was one of the most violent incidents of racial conflict in American history. It underscored  the economic and social struggles faced by African American sharecroppers in the face of violent white supremacy.

Little Rock Nine

 
The Little Rock Nine were a group of nine students who attended segregated black high schools in Little Rock, the capital of the state of Arkansas.  They each volunteered when the state NAACP, led by Daisy Bates, obtained federal court orders to integrate the prestigious Little Rock Central High School in September, 1957. The Nine faced intense harassment and threats of  violence from white parents and students, as well as organized white supremacy groups.  The enraged opposition emphasized miscegenation as the threat to white society.

Arkansas GovernorOrval Faubus, claiming his only goal was to preserve the peace, deployed the Arkansas National Guard to prevent the blacks from entering the school. Faubus defied federal court orders, whereupon President Dwight D. Eisenhower intervened. He federalized the Arkansas National Guard and sent them home. 

Then Eisenhower sent in a 1200-man elite Army combat unit to escort the students to school and protect them between classes during the 1957-58 school year. In class, however, the Nine were teased and ridiculed every day. In the city compromise efforts all failed and political tensions continued to fester. A year later in September 1958 the U.S. Supreme Court ruled that all the city's high schools had to be integrated immediately. Governor Faubus and the legislature responded by immediately shutting down all the public high schools in the city for the entire 1958–1959 school year, despite the harm it did to all the students. The decision to integrate the school was a landmark event in the history of civil rights. The bravery and determination of the Nine in the face of violent opposition is remembered as a key moment in American history. The city and state were entangled in very expensive legal disputes for decades, while suffering a reputation for hatred and obstruction.

Since 1965
As of the 2020 U.S. Census, African Americans were 15.1% of the state's population.

Notable people
Daisy Bates, NAACP leader
Bobo Brazil, wrestler
Big Bill Broonzy, singer
Mamie Phipps Clark, psychologist
Milton Crenchaw, Tuskegee flier
Joycelyn Elders, US Surgeon General
Silas Herbert Hunt, integration leader
Louis Jordan, musician
John H. Johnson, publisher
Edith Irby Jones, integration leader
Samuel L. Kountz, surgeon
Sonny Liston, boxer
Luenell, actress
Florence Price, composer
Rodney E. Slater, cabinet member
Sister Rosetta Tharpe, singer

See also

Black Southerners
Demographics of Arkansas
 History of Arkansas
List of African-American newspapers in Arkansas

References

Further reading

 Buckelew, Richard Allan. "Racial violence in Arkansas: Lynchings and mob rule, 1860--1930" (PhD dissertation,  University of Arkansas; ProQuest Dissertations Publishing,  1999. 99594200.
 Encyclopedia of Arkansas (2023) online, detailed entries by  experts.
 Finley, Randy. From Slavery to Uncertain Freedom: The Freedman's Bureau in Arkansas 1865-1869 (University of Arkansas Press, 1996).

 Gordon, Fon Louise. Caste and Class: The Black Experience in Arkansas, 1880-1920 (University of Georgia Press, 2007) online.
 Graves, John. Town and Country: Race Relations in an Urban-Rural Context, Arkansas, 1865–1905  (University of Arkansas Press, 1990)
 Jones-Branch, Cherisse. Better Living by Their Own Bootstraps: Black Women's Activism in Rural Arkansas, 1914-1965 (University of Arkansas Press, 2023) online.

 Kirk, John A. "The Little Rock crisis and postwar black activism in Arkansas." Arkansas Historical Quarterly 56.3 (1997): 273-293. online
 Lovett, Bobby L. "African Americans, Civil War, and Aftermath in Arkansas". Arkansas Historical Quarterly 54.3 (1995): 304–358. in JSTOR

 Moneyhon, Carl H. "Black Politics in Arkansas during the Gilded Age, 1876-1900." Arkansas Historical Quarterly 44.3 (1985): 222-245. online
 Parry, Janine A., and William H. Miller. " 'The Great Negro State of the Country?' Black Legislators in Arkansas: 1973-2000." Journal of Black Studies 36.6 (2006): 833-872. online

 Pearce, Larry Wesley. "The American Missionary Association and the Freedmen in Arkansas, 1863-1878."  Arkansas Historical Quarterly 30.2 (1971): 123-144. online

 Riffel, Brent E. "Lynching" Encyclopedia of Arkansas (2023) online
 Smith, C. Calvin. "Serving the Poorest of the Poor: Black Medical Practitioners in the Arkansas Delta, 1880-1960." Arkansas Historical Quarterly 57.3 (1998): 287-308. online
 Taylor, Orville. Negro Slavery in Arkansas (1958; reprinted  University of Arkansas Press, 2000). online

 Wintory, Blake J. "African-American legislators in the Arkansas general assembly, 1868-1893."  Arkansas Historical Quarterly 65.4 (2006): 385-434. online

Primary sources
 Gatewood, Willard B. ed. "Arkansas Negroes in the 1890s: Documents." Arkansas Historical Quarterly 33.4 (1974): 293-325. online

 Morgan, Gordon D., and Izola Preston. The edge of campus: A journal of the Black experience at the University of Arkansas (University of Arkansas Press, 1990) online
 Nash, Horace D. "Blacks in Arkansas during Reconstruction: The Ex-Slave Narratives." Arkansas Historical Quarterly 48.3 (1989): 243-259. online

External links
African Americans
Free Blacks

African-American history of Arkansas